Mianzimu (缅茨姆) is a summit in the Meili Xue Shan of Yunnan province, China. At , it is the fourth highest peak in the range (after Kawagebo, Cogar Laka and Nairi Denka), and is located at the southern end of the range. It is regarded as one of the world's most beautiful mountains.

References

Mountains of Yunnan
Geography of Dêqên Tibetan Autonomous Prefecture